"Tequila" is a song by British DJ Jax Jones and French DJ Martin Solveig under their alias Europa, with vocals from British singer Raye, released as a single on 21 February 2020. While this marks the first time Solveig and Raye collaborated, it is the second time Jones and Raye, as well as Jones and Solveig worked together, on "You Don't Know Me" and "All Day and Night", respectively.

Background
Jones first introduced the song at the Brooklyn nightclub "Elsewhere" on 20 April 2019. The song was then described as "characteristically bass-heavy" and "uptempo". During an interview on 23 January 2020, Raye revealed that the song would be out soon and that it is the "only other record" her and Jones had written together. On 4 February 2020, Jones posted a clip of himself preparing a meal in the kitchen with a snippet of the song playing as he opens a pot. He went on to post a clip of the trio at the video set in front of a green screen.

Cover art
The cover was revealed on 17 February 2020 and shows a red BMW E30 M3 with stereotypical Mexican illustrations in the background.

Charts

Weekly charts

Year-end charts

Certifications

References

2020 songs
2020 singles
Europa (musical duo) songs
Songs written by Jax Jones
Raye (singer) songs
Songs about alcohol
Songs written by Jin Jin (musician)
Songs written by Martin Solveig
Songs written by Mark Ralph (record producer)
Songs written by Raye (singer)
Songs written by MNEK
Song recordings produced by Mark Ralph (record producer)
Song recordings produced by Jax Jones